Sadat is a town and a nagar panchayat in Ghazipur district in the Indian state of Uttar Pradesh.

Geography
It has an average elevation of 68 metres (223 feet).

Demographics
As of the 2001 Census of India, Sadat had a population of 22,090 Which's highest in that Region. Males constitute 51% of the population and females 49%. Sadat has an average literacy rate of 67%, higher than the national average of 59.5%: male literacy is 77%, and female literacy is 57%. In Sadat, 18% of the population is under 6 years of age. Sadat divided into 11 wards. These names are -
Ward No - 01 (Ambedkar Nagar),
Ward No - 02 (Shastri Nagar),
Ward No - 03 (Kalyan Nagar),
Ward No - 04 (Deendayal Nagar),
Ward No - 05 (Gandhi Nagar),
Ward No - 06 (Shri Nagar),
Ward No - 07 (Shaheed Nagar),
Ward No - 08 (Azad Nagar),
Ward No - 09 (Hedgewar Nagar),
Ward No - 10 [Purani Bazar(Saiyadbada)],
Ward No - 11 (Mahmoodpur Zunardar),

References

Cities and towns in Ghazipur district